Peschanka is a rural locality (a khutor) in Ilovlinskoye Rural Settlement, Ilovlinsky District, Volgograd Oblast, Russia. The population was 542 as of 2010. There are 10 streets.

Geography 
Peschanka is located in steppe, on the left bank of the Ilovlya River, on the Volga Upland, 9 km northeast of Ilovlya (the district's administrative centre) by road. Avilov is the nearest rural locality.

References 

Rural localities in Ilovlinsky District